Shibi Station is an interchange station of Line 2 and Line 7 of the Guangzhou Metro. The underground station is under Shibi Village, Xiebian Highway, Panyu District, Guangzhou. It started operation on 25 September 2010.

Station layout

Exits
There are 4 exits, lettered A, B, C and D.

External links 

Railway stations in China opened in 2010
Guangzhou Metro stations in Panyu District